Ainult hulludele ehk halastajaõde (also known as Halastajaõde) is a 1990 Estonian drama film directed by Arvo Iho.

Awards:
 1991: Monstra Internationale del Film d'Auttore (San Remo, Italy), best actress award: Margarita Terekhova
 1992: Rouen Nordic Film Festival (France), 1992, best actress award: Margarita Terekhova

Plot

Cast
 Margarita Terekhova - Rita
 Hendrik Toompere Sr. - Olav
 Hendrik Toompere Jr. - Johan
 Mihkel Smeljanski - Viktor
 Lembit Ulfsak - Andres
 Vija Artmane - Siina
 Maria Avdjuško - Eva
 Jaan Tätte - Toomas
 Katrin Kohv - Leida
 Ines Aru - Ilse
 Aire Koop - Marta

References

External links
 
 Ainult hulludele ehk halastajaõde, entry in Estonian Film Database (EFIS)

1990 films
Estonian drama films
Estonian-language films
Tallinnfilm films
Films directed by Arvo Iho
Soviet-era Estonian films